Cameron Elizabeth Carr ( Goodman; born August 24, 1984) is an American actress.

Career
Carr has been in numerous films in her career, first starting out in 2002 as a freshman doing her comedic acting at Syracuse University in a show called SU Live. In 2003, she left Syracuse and transferred to Georgetown University in Washington, D.C.  

Carr had guest roles on ABC's Sons & Daughters, CSI: NY, Cold Case series, NCIS, The Suite Life of Zack & Cody, as well as a supporting role in the Lucy Liu/Nick Lachey horror/neo-noir movie Rise: Blood Hunter. Between 2006 and 2007, she was a cast member of Nick Cannon's Wild 'N Out. Carr also Starred in the 2008 Horror/Thriller, Shuttle in Boston and appeared on MTV's Exposed. She was also featured in the German movie Friendship!

In 2009, she starred as Renny Davidson, the love interest of Kit Walker (Ryan Carnes) in the 2-part The Movie Network/Syfy comic book miniseries The Phantom.

In 2011, Cameron played Amber Lee Adams in the Disney movie Sharpay's Fabulous Adventure alongside Ashley Tisdale, Austin Butler and Lauren Collins. That same year, she landed a recurring role on the CW network hit series, 90210, as a sorority girl named Bree who takes interest in the main character, Annie.

Filmography

Films

Television

References

External links
 

Actresses from Washington, D.C.
American film actresses
American television actresses
Georgetown University alumni
Living people
Actresses from Texas
Syracuse University alumni
1984 births
21st-century American actresses